Leslie George Robert McGuire (31 January 1929 – February 2017) was an English footballer active in the 1940s and 1950s who played as an inside forward. He made a total of six appearances in The Football League for Gillingham.

References

1929 births
2017 deaths
English footballers
Association football forwards
English Football League players
Gillingham F.C. players